Phyllosticta palmetto is a fungal plant pathogen infecting coconuts.

References

External links
 Index Fungorum
 USDA ARS Fungal Database

Fungal plant pathogens and diseases
Coconut palm diseases
palmetto